Coenophila subrosea, the rosy marsh moth, is a moth of the family Noctuidae. The species was first described by James Francis Stephens in 1829. It is found from southern Great Britain, Italy and France, through central Europe north to Scandinavia, east to Russia, from Siberia to the Amur region, Ussuri and Sakhalin, south to northern China, east to Korea and northern Japan.

The wingspan is .Warren (1914) states 
R. subrosea Stph. (= rhomboidea Stph. nec Esp.) (7 i). Forewing rufous grey, dusted with pale grey; stigmata large, pale grey; the cell rufous or red-brown; the claviform obsolete; hindwing greyish ochreous, with diffusely darker border; fringe ochreous. Typical subrosea Stph. occurred formerly within a restricted area in the fens of Britain, but is now extinct.  The form subcoerulea Stgr. (7 k) which is bluer grey, is found in Sweden, Prussia, Russia and in Amurland.  Larva reddish grey, with paler lines;the spiracular line brighter yellow ; food plants Myrica, Gale'''' and Salix.

The larvae feed on Betula nana, Myrica gale, Calluna vulgaris, Vaccinium uliginosum, Andromeda polifolia and Ledum palustre''.

References

External links

Swedish Lepidoptera
Lepiforum e.V.

Noctuinae
Moths of Japan
Moths of Europe
Taxa named by James Francis Stephens